A lysimeter (from Greek λύσις (loosening) and the suffix -meter) is a measuring device which can be used to measure the amount of actual evapotranspiration which is released by plants (usually crops or trees). By recording the amount of precipitation that an area receives and the amount lost through the soil, the amount of water lost to evapotranspiration can be calculated.
Lysimeters are of two types: weighing and non-weighing.

General Usage

A lysimeter is most accurate when vegetation is grown in a large soil tank which allows the rainfall input and water lost through the soil to be easily calculated. The amount of water lost by evapotranspiration can be worked out by calculating the difference between the weight before and after the precipitation input.

For trees, lysimeters can be expensive and are a poor representation of conditions outside of a laboratory, as it would be impossible to use a lysimeter to calculate the water balance for a whole forest.  But for farm crops, a lysimeter can represent field conditions well since the device is installed and used outside the laboratory.  A weighing lysimeter, for example, reveals the amount of water crops use by constantly weighing a huge block of soil in a field to detect losses of soil moisture (as well as any gains from precipitation).

The University of Arizona's Biosphere 2 built the world's largest weighing lysimeters using a mixture of thirty 220,000 and 333,000 lb-capacity column load cells from Honeywell, Inc. as part of its Landscape Evolution Observatory project.

Use in whole plant physiological phenotyping systems

To date, physiology-based, high-throughput phenotyping systems (also known as plant functional phenotyping systems), which, used in combination with soil–plant–atmosphere continuum (SPAC) measurements and fitting models of plant responses to continuous and fluctuating environmental conditions, should be further investigated in order to serve as a phenotyping tool to better understand and characterise plant stress response.
In these systems (known also as gravimetric system), plants are placed on weighing lysimeters that measure changes in pot weight at high frequency. This data is then combined with measurements of environmental parameters in the greenhouse, including radiation, humidity and temperature, as well as soil water conditions. Using pre-measured data including soil weight and initial plant weight, a great deal of phenotypic data can be extracted including data on stomatal conductance, growth rates, transpiration and soil water content and plant dynamic behaviour such as the critical ɵ point, which is the soil water content at which plants start to respond to stress by reducing their stomatal conductance.

The Faculty of Agriculture at the Hebrew university of Jerusalem has the most advanced functional phenotyping system in the world, with more than 400 units screened simultaneously.

History
In 1875 Edward Lewis Sturtevant, a botanist from Massachusetts, built the first lysimeter in the United States.

References
8. Reth S., Perez-Priego O., Coners H., Nolz R. (2021) Chapter 58. "Lysimeter" in Springer Handbook of Atmospheric Measurements: 1613-1628 ID: 10.1007/978-3-030-52171-4 – 058
Measuring instruments
Plant physiology
Agrometeorology